George Bruce Kaiser (born July 29, 1942) is an American billionaire businessman. He is the chairman of BOK Financial Corporation in Tulsa, Oklahoma. As of September 2021, he is the 476th richest person in the world and was, in 2012, one of the top 50 American philanthropists.

Early life
Kaiser was born on July 29, 1942, in Tulsa, Oklahoma. He attended Central High School in Tulsa. He earned a BA from Harvard College in 1964 and an MBA from the Harvard Business School in 1966. He briefly considered joining the U.S. Foreign Service, but instead returned to Tulsa in 1966 to work for his father.  Kaiser-Francis Oil Co. was created in the 1940s by Kaiser's uncle and parents, Jewish refugees from Nazi Germany who settled in Oklahoma.

George's father, Herman George Kaiser, had been an attorney in the district of the Kammergericht in Berlin until 1933, when he was dismissed by the Nazis because he was Jewish. He and his wife Kate then moved to Rostock where Herman Kaiser worked with his father-in-law Max Samuel's EMSA-Werke company. Herman Kaiser escaped to England in 1937 and his wife and daughter came over in September the following year. In 1940 all three emigrated to the United States. They settled in Tulsa, where Herman's aunt and uncle already lived. Herman joined the uncle's oil drilling business. Their son was born in Tulsa. Herman died in Tulsa on October 14, 1992, at the age of 88.

Career

Oil and gas
Kaiser took control of Kaiser-Francis Oil Company in 1969, after his father had a heart attack. Kaiser-Francis was a little-known, privately owned oil prospecting and drilling company at the time. Under George's management, it became the 23rd largest nonpublic energy exploration company in the U.S. by 2010. In that year the company earned about $217 million, based on estimates by Bloomberg News.

Banking
In 1990, Kaiser bought Bank of Oklahoma out of Federal Deposit Insurance Corporation receivership.  Despite BOK's depressed state, it was rich enough to land Kaiser on the Forbes 400 at one stroke.  He has since expanded BOK from a 20-branch company located solely in Oklahoma into a $23.9 billion bank with operations in nine states.  He owns 61.5 percent of BOK. As of 2007, Kaiser's ownership interests in BOK were worth $2.3 billion. In 2008, with an estimated  net worth of around $12 billion, he was ranked by Forbes as the 20-richest person in America and the richest person in Oklahoma.  In March 2009, in the face of the general world economic downturn, Forbes reported that Kaiser's net worth had dropped to $9 billion, ranking him in a tie for 43rd-richest person in the world. As of 2023, George's net worth was estimated at $13.3 billion.

Professional sports
In April 2014, Kaiser bought Tom L. Ward's interest in The Professional Basketball Club, the investment group headed by Clay Bennett that owns the Oklahoma City Thunder of the National Basketball Association, as well as its Oklahoma City Blue minor league affiliate.

Personal life
Kaiser's nephew is actor Tim Blake Nelson.

Kaiser has been married twice:
 His first wife was Betty Eudene. Betty was a prominent literacy advocate volunteering more than 7,000 hours with the Tulsa City-County Library's literacy program. Betty died in 2002. The couple had three children: Philip, Leah and Emily. They also have five grandchildren: Shai, Eytan, Aidan, Ilan, and Ben.
 His second wife is Myra Block, who is a curator, authority on fiber art and founder of 108 Contemporary. She is the daughter of Tulsa oilman and philanthropist Charles Goodall, known for establishing the small cities program on the Council of Jewish Federations. The couple divides their time between Tulsa, Oklahoma, and San Francisco, California.

Kaiser typically works 70 hours a week in his office, spending half his time on philanthropy and the rest on banking, energy and other business interests.

Kaiser is affiliated with the Egalitarian Conservative Congregation B'Nai Emunah.

Kaiser avoids publicity, does not attend society functions and hardly ever gives interviews. While he owns homes in Tulsa and San Francisco, he is said to own no vacation homes, airplanes or yachts.

Philanthropy 
Kaiser is listed third on BusinessWeek'''s 2008 list of the top 50 American philanthropists, behind Warren Buffett and Bill and Melinda Gates."Warren Buffett Tops BusinessWeek's Annual Ranking of 'The 50 Most Generous Philanthropists,"  BusinessWeek press release, November 25, 2008. Among his prominent causes is fighting childhood poverty through the George Kaiser Family Foundation; he is also a major benefactor to the Jewish community in Oklahoma, which numbers about 5,000 people."25 Billionaires and Millionaires That Became Philanthropists," Business Pundit, August 4, 2008. He has been notably active in the promotion of early childhood education.David L. Kirp, "You're Doing Fine, Oklahoma! The universal pre-K movement takes off in unlikely places,"  The American Prospect, November 1, 2004."George Kaiser Speech on Childhood Education,"  The New York Times, February 7, 2007. Kaiser's family foundation is also the largest contributor to the Tulsa Community Foundation, which Kaiser established in 1998 because of his perception that Tulsa's historical dependence on unorganized private giving from its wealthy families was no longer effective.  Beginning with gifts from seventeen local philanthropists, by 2006 this foundation had grown to become the largest community foundation in the United States, and now has approximately four billion dollars in assets.Matt Cauthron, "Officials expect Tulsa Community Foundation to be largest in nation", The Journal Record, May 10, 2006."Top Funders: 25 Largest Community Foundations by Asset Size", Foundation Center website (accessed January 26, 2011).

Kaiser's family foundation funded the National Energy Policy Institute, a non-profit energy policy organization located at the University of Tulsa whose president since its inception is former Alaska governor Tony Knowles. and whose director was former U.S. Representative Brad Carson. In January 2009, Kaiser drew attention after he told a committee of the Oklahoma House of Representatives that the state should eliminate or reduce tax incentives for the oil and gas industry, and instead use the money for health care or education programs or for tax cuts for other taxpayers.<ref>"Digger George: Kaiser wants plug on energy incentives," The Oklahoman, January 25, 2009.</ref>

The foundation was instrumental in the funding of Tulsa's Woody Guthrie Center, which opened in 2013, and then in facilitating (together with the University of Tulsa) the acquisition in 2016 of Bob Dylan's 6,000-piece archive, which will be maintained by archivists at the university's Helmerich Center for American Research at Gilcrease Museum.

The Kaiser family foundation is responsible for the initial funding leading to Tulsa's A Gathering Place. This park is the largest privately funded park project in the United States. The foundation's donation amounted to $350 million.

Kaiser's family foundation was a large investor in the now-defunct Solyndra Corporation. The company has revealed that the foundation invested $340 million in the venture in July 2009, and subsequently gave preferential consideration to a plant site proposed for an economically depressed area of North Tulsa. The plant was never built and Solyndra filed for bankruptcy in Fremont, California, on September 6, 2011.

Kaiser is among those who have made The Giving Pledge, a commitment to give away half of his wealth for charitable purposes.

Kaiser's philanthropy focuses on stimulating economic growth and combatting poverty with investments in early education and health care for people who need it the most. He is a strong proponent of programs like Early Head Start and Educare. An article in Forbes quoted him as saying "Those who have won the ovarian lottery by being born in an advanced society to loving parents have a special obligation to help restore the American Dream."

The Kaiser foundation supports the training of teachers specializing in early education by donating $1.2 million per year to Tulsa Community College and Oklahoma University to fund training programs. It also reimburses the students' tuition if they work in Oklahoma for four years after graduating. The foundation has also brought at least 150 young teachers to Tulsa through the Teach for America program.

Kaiser learned that poverty has a major effect on life expectancy. Before he became involved in funding health care, he was informed that there was a 14-year difference in life expectancy between children born in richest and poorest ZIP codes. Kaiser concluded that too few doctors were available to treat the poorer people. His foundation then donated $62 million to the University of Oklahoma to create a School of Community Medicine at its Tulsa campus. The money supplemented a $20 million donation by the Schusterman family. The grants reimburse all tuition for students who graduate as doctors and who work for five years in the community.

Kaiser's philosophy about anonymous charitable giving reportedly is "naming rights are a seductive philanthropic inducement, yet more anonymous operational support may better advance the charitable purpose."

Political activities 
A Wall Street Journal article reported in 2004 that campaign contribution records showed that Kaiser had donated $10,000 to Democratic Party political candidates for every $1,000 that he gave Republican Party candidates.

Kaiser was a fundraiser for the 2008 presidential campaign of Barack Obama, and functioned as a campaign bundler for Obama. At one 2007 event for Obama, he raised more than $250,000.

A 2011 article by Bill Allison of the Sunlight Foundation analyzed Kaiser's business activities and his use of legal tax avoidance strategies, including how during the 1980s bust in the oil industry in Oklahoma and Texas, Kaiser bought up struggling energy companies whose losses provided him with tax deductions that effectively offset his own income and left him with little or no tax liability.

References

1942 births
American billionaires
American people of German-Jewish descent
Businesspeople from Tulsa, Oklahoma
Giving Pledgers
21st-century philanthropists
Harvard Business School alumni
Harvard College alumni
Jewish American philanthropists
Living people
Philanthropists from Oklahoma
21st-century American Jews